Martin Ruzé, Lord of Beaulieu of Longjumeau and Chilly (c. 1526, in Tours – 6 November 1613, in Paris) was a French politician of the late sixteenth and early seventeenth century, who was Secretary of State of the Maison du Roi (or King's Secretary) under Henry III of France, Henry IV of France and Louis XIII.

Biography 

He was the son of William Ruzé, Adviser to the Parliament, and Catherine Briconnet. He was the son of another William Ruzé, Lord of Beaulieu, Receiver General of Touraine, Mayor of Tours in 1534. He had a brother, also named William Ruzé (born about 1520; died 28 September 1587), who was confessor and adviser of kings Henry II, Charles IX and Henri III, who was appointed bishop of Saint-Malo 1570, then bishop of Angers on 29 August 1572.

He began his career in the entourage of the king in 1551, with Henry II. From 1571 to 1588 he was general superintendent of ammunition and food. In 1573-1574 he was secretary to the King of Poland and in that capacity, he countersigned and raised the royal seal on the letters of King. In August 1574 he was appointed fifth secretary of state.

On 25 September 1576 he became advisor of the king and his secretary Finance, and to the Queen Mother (Catherine de Medici). In 1578, after the resignation of Louis Valley, he was provided with the load controller of the Chancellery.

On 10 April 1589 he became Grand Treasurer of the Order of the Holy Spirit to replace the former Secretary of State Nicolas de Neufville, seigneur de Villeroy, in disgrace, and he retained that office until his death.

On 15 April 1589 he installed, for Henry III, Philippe de Mornay in the office of Governor of Saumur. The ceremony took place in front of the arbor: Florent Lessart, the former governor, faithful to Henry III brought the keys of the city, but out of spite and shame, he dropped to the ground. It is the king's secretary, who then picked up and presented them to the new governor.

In 1590, when Henri IV unsuccessfully besieged Laon, faithful to the Catholic League, which was then headed by the Duke of Mayenne, the king had with him, Louis Potier de Gesvres and Louis Revol, while Peter Forget de Fresnes was in Paris.

In 1596, he bought land Longjumeau, Chilly-Michel Gaillard. Having no children, he bequeathed his property to Antoine Coëffier de Ruzé, Marquis Effiat, his nephew, who later became Superintendent of Finance (1626) and Marshal of France (1631).

In 1601, during the reign of Henry IV, he was appointed Grand Master of Mining and Pierre de Beringhen comptroller-general. Sully ordered them to form a committee to study and conduct excavations in the kingdom of France.

On 3 March 1606 Henri IV gets him enlisting Antoine Lomenie, Adviser to the King in his Councils, Cabinet Secretary, who had long been his chief clerk, to relieve him in his task, Because of his age. 

On 26 August 1609 he established a will to his heir nephew Antoine Coëffier de Ruzé d'Effiat, on condition of taking the name and arms of Ruze. He died on 6 November 1613.

The black marble tomb, topped by a statue of the deceased kneeling, can be seen in the church of Saint-Etienne de Chilly-Mazarin.

References

1526 births
1613 deaths
Ministers of Marine and the Colonies